Dorasan or Mount Dora is a 156-metre hill on the north bank of the Imjin River in northernmost Paju, South Korea.  It lies very near the Korean Demilitarized Zone.  The hill gives its name to several nearby landmarks, including Dorasan Station and the Mt. Dora Observatory, as well as to the local administrative unit Dorasan-ri.

Overview
The hill's name can be translated as "Silla City Mountain."  According to legend, the last king of Silla, King Gyeongsun, dwelt nearby after he gave up his throne to Taejo of Goryeo.  Unable to return to Silla, King Gyeongsun would walk to the top of Dorasan and weep for his home in Gyeongju.  Due to this historical significance, "Dorasan" was chosen as the name of the train station.

See also
 Dorasan Station
 Division of Korea
 List of mountains in Korea

Notes

External links
Speech given by George W. Bush at Dorasan Station in 2002

Paju
Landforms of Gyeonggi Province
Korean Demilitarized Zone
Hills of South Korea